Sheree Toth is a professor of psychology at the University of Rochester, as well as an associate professor of psychiatry and the executive director of the Mt. Hope Family Center. She works in the field of developmental psychopathology, especially concerning maltreated children.

Toth earned both a Master’s degree and a Ph.D. in clinical psychology from Case Western Reserve University. She has served as associate editor of Development and Psychopathology. Toth received the Outstanding Research Article Award from the American Professional Society on the Abuse of Children in 2004 and 2007.

Selected works 
 
Cicchetti, D., & Toth, S. L. (in press). A multilevel perspective on child maltreatment.  In M. Lamb & C. Garcia Coll (Eds.), Handbook of child psychology and developmental science, 7th ed., Vol. 3: Socioemotional process. New York: Wiley.
Cicchetti, D., Toth, S. L., & Handley, E. D. (in press). Genetic moderation of interpersonal psychotherapy efficacy for low-income mothers with major depressive disorder: Evidence for vantage sensitivity. Development and Psychopathology.
Toth, S. L., & Cicchetti, D. (2013). A developmental psychopathology perspective on child maltreatment (Special Issue). Child Maltreatment, 18, 135–139.
Toth, S. L., Gravener-Davis, J. A., Guild, D. J., & Cicchetti, D. (2013). Relational interventions for child maltreatment:  Past, present and future perspectives.  Development and Psychopathology: 25th Anniversary Edition, 25:4(2), 1601–1617. 
Pickreign Stronach, E. S., Toth, S. L., Rogosch, F. A., & Cicchetti, D. (2013). Preventive interventions and sustained attachment security in maltreated children:  A 12-month follow-up of a randomized controlled trial. Development and Psychopathology, 25:4(1), 919–930. 
Toth, S. L., Rogosch, F. A., Oshri, A., Gravener, J., Sturm, R. & Morgan-Lopez, A. (2013).  The efficacy of interpersonal psychotherapy for economically disadvantaged mothers. Development and Psychopathology, 25:4(1), 1065–1078.
Gravener, J. A., Rogosch, F. A., Oshri, A., Narayan, A., Cicchetti, D., & Toth, S. L. (2012). The relations among maternal depressive disorder, maternal Expressed Emotion, and toddler behavior problems and attachment. Journal of Abnormal Child Psychology, 40, 803–813.
Toth, S. L. and Gravener, J. (2012). Bridging research and practice: Relational interventions for maltreated children. Child and Adolescent Mental Health, 17, 131–138. 
Toth, S.L. & Manly, J. T. (2011) Bridging research and practice: Challenges and successes in implementing evidence-based preventive intervention strategies for child maltreatment. Child Abuse and Neglect, 35, 633–636.
Toth, S. L., Manly, J. T. & Hathaway, A. (2011). Relational interventions for young children who have been maltreated.  In J. D. Osofsky (Ed.). Clinical Work with Traumatized Young Children. (pp. 96–113). New York:  Guilford Press.

References

External links 
 
 Mt. Hope Family Center Executive Director, Dr. Sheree Toth talks about services for abused and neglected children
 Toth, Sheree L. (2011). When does spanking become abuse? "CNN Opinion."

American women psychologists
21st-century American psychologists
American psychiatrists
University of Rochester faculty
Case Western Reserve University alumni
Year of birth missing (living people)
Living people
American women psychiatrists
American women academics
21st-century American women